The Slave raid of Suðuroy were a slave raid by pirates from Northwest Africa that took place on Suðuroy in the Faroe Islands in the summer of 1629. It resulted in the abduction of over thirty people, mainly women and children, who were evidently not ransomed and lived their lives in slavery in the Middle East.

Background
The isolated Faroe Islands had a long history of problems with pirates as well as fishermen intruding on the islands' fishing waters. Because of its geographical position, and its small population with limited possibilities to defend themselves, the islands became a popular resting place for pirates, who stopped along its beaches to pause. During those pauses, the poor and defenseless population were sometimes exposed to pillage and theft, and were unable to defend themselves other than by running to high mountainous terrain and by throwing stones at the pirates. Raids by Irish, English and Barbary pirates became worse in the early 17th-century.

The raid
In the summer of 1629, three Barbary pirate ships with 500 pirates entered the Kvalbø Bay at Suderø. They had a Faroese guide, the brother of the owner of the Nøstgaard farm, who felt that his brother had cheated him on his inheritance, and who showed the pirates to his brother's farm and the rest of the parish.

Parishioners fled to hide in caves and between rocks in the highlands. Six people were reportedly killed during the pillage, while over thirty women and children were abducted. Among the children taken were the seven-year-old son of the parish vicar Hr. Povel. The vicar reportedly, in his desperation, sang a galdr song against the pirate ship containing his son. This was seen as the reason that this ship went aground, which caused all on the ship, including the vicar's son, to drown, causing his father to become mentally unstable for the rest of his life.

The remaining ships left the island the day after the attack. Those inhabitants in hiding testified afterward, that they could hear the cries from the captives from inside the pirate ships when they left.

Legacy 
On 6 July 1629, the survivals and authorities wrote a letter to king Christian IV to ask for his protection against the pirates. When informed about the women and children abducted, the king ordered the Faroese population to collect a ransom for the prisoners to save them from slavery. However, the Faroese replied that the poverty caused by several years of piracy on the island, had made it impossible to collect the money necessary to buy the prisoners back.

However, the 1629 pirate raid had a big impact on the history of the islands: it was the reason that the king ordered the building of the Skansin fortress in Thorshavn in 1630. The pirate raids did continue throughout the 17th century, but the fortress made it possible for the population to protect themselves, and no successful piracy raids are noted until the 1660s.

See also
 Sack of Baltimore
 Turkish Abductions
 Barbary slave trade
 Sklavenkasse

References

1629 in Europe
1620s in Africa
Piracy
Barbary slave trade
Kidnappings
Massacres
1620s in the Ottoman Empire
Looting
Slavery in the Ottoman Empire
17th century in the Faroe Islands